Russell County is a historic county in the Canadian province of Ontario.

It was created in 1800 from a portion of Stormont County. It later merged with Prescott County to form Prescott and Russell United Counties.

Cumberland Township became part of the Regional Municipality of Ottawa–Carleton in 1969, and is now part of the single-tier city of Ottawa.

Historic townships
Cambridge (SE) - Now part of the Nation Township
Clarence (NE) -  Merged with Rockland to become the city of Clarence-Rockland
Cumberland (NW) - Now part of the city of Ottawa
Russell (SW) - Still exists

See also
 List of Ontario census divisions
 List of townships in Ontario

External links
 1951 map of Russell County
Bibliography

Former counties in Ontario
Populated places disestablished in 1969